Rémi Boutillier and Maxime Teixeira were the defending champions, but only Teixeira defended his title partnering Maxime Chazal. Teixeira lost in the first round to Alejandro González and Luis David Martínez.

Alexander Satschko and Simon Stadler won the title after defeating Gong Maoxin and Yasutaka Uchiyama 6–3, 7–6(7–2) in the final.

Seeds

Draw

References
 Main Draw

Internationaux de Tennis de BLOIS - Doubles
2016 Doubles